New Worlds for Old is an anthology of science fiction stories edited by American writer  August Derleth.  It was first published by Four Square Books in 1963 and contains nine stories from Derleth's earlier anthology, Worlds of Tomorrow.  Many of the stories had originally appeared in the magazines Fantastic, Fantasy: The Magazine of Science Fiction, Worlds Beyond, Astounding Stories, The Fantasy Fan, Fantasy and Science Fiction and Weird Tales.

Contents

 "The Smile", by Ray Bradbury
 "The Fires Within", by Arthur C. Clarke
 "The Gentleman Is an Epwa", by Carl Jacobi
 "The Enchanted Forest", by Fritz Leiber
 "The Great Cold", by Frank Belknap Long
 "From Beyond", by H. P. Lovecraft
 "Line to Tomorrow", by Lewis Padgett
 "The Business, as Usual", by Mack Reynolds
 "The Martian and the Moron", by Theodore Sturgeon

Sources

1963 anthologies
Science fiction anthologies